FAQ U was a television programme broadcast by Channel 4 in the United Kingdom in 2005. It was shown every weeknight, Monday to Friday, just after 11:00pm. It was presented by Justin Lee Collins in its first week, David Mitchell in the second and Karen Taylor in the third. It included four comedian guests and an audience. The presenter put "frequently asked questions" to the guests and they answered them in a humorous way. The show's title was frequently pronounced by the presenter as "Fak You".

Guests
Guests included:
 Matt Blaize
 Elizabeth Bower
 Frankie Boyle
 Ruth Bratt
 Alan Carr
 Paul Foot
 Cherry Green
 Iain Lee
 Alex Lovell
 Henning Wehn
 Alex Zane

External links

Channel 4 original programming
2005 British television series debuts
2005 British television series endings
Television series by Zeppotron